Boléro is an album by jazz guitarist Larry Coryell that was released by String Records in 1981. The album was released on CD in 1993 by Evidence and includes the tracks from the LP At the Airport (1983) recorded with guitarist Brian Keane.

Reception
AllMusic awarded the album with 4 out of 5 stars. The Penguin Guide review gave 2.5 stars out of 4 and said, "Coryell had already tackled Ravel (and Robert de Visee) on The Restful Mind and it was inevitable that he would add "Boléro" to "Pavane for a Dead Princess". Ravel was a perfectly logical focus for Coryell and he also tackles the prelude from "Le Tombeau De Couperin", lending it an  elaborate contrapuntal feel that almost buries the intriguing modal progression that links it to the gypsy and flamenco traditions that intrigue both men."

Coryell performed the "Improvisation on Boléro" at the Guitar Legends Festival in Seville, October 1991.

Track listing
"Improvisation on Boléro" (Maurice Ravel) – 7:27
"Nothing is Forever" (Coryell) – 3:20
"Something for Wolfgang Amadeus" (Coryell) – 3:53
"Prelude from Tombeau de Couperin" (Ravel) – 1:42
"Elegancia Del Sol" (Coryell) – 3:37
"Fancy Frogs" (Coryell) – 3:55
"6th Watch Hill Road" (Coryell) – 4:09
"Blues in Madrid" (Coryell) – 3:03
"Motel Time" (Coryell) – 1:51
"At The Airport" (Keane, S. Schneider) – 4:30
"Brazilia" (Keane) – 7:18
"A Piece for Larry" (Keane) – 2:42
"La Pluie" (Coryell) – 3:35
"Waltz No.6" (Coryell) – 4:26
"Logical Solution" (Keane) – 3:52
"Warm Weather" (Keane) – 2:40
"Patty's Song" (Keane) – 2:52
"Lines" (Coryell) – 6:07

Personnel
Larry Coryell – 6-string and 12-string guitars
Brian Keane – 6-string and 12-string guitars

References 

Larry Coryell albums
Evidence Music albums